Porto Sant'Elpidio is a coastal town in the province of Fermo, Marche, Italy. The commune has a population of 25,071.

Geography
The commune is principally developed along the coast, following the two principal coastal roads: Statale 16 Road and the Adriatic Railway line.

The city's territory is included between the Chienti (north) and the Tenna (south) rivers. Today, it follows a strong demographic increase from later years, and the development is continuing on the low hills that rise immediately inland from the Statale 16 Road; the Corva and Cretarola districts are the highest point of the city's territory, with interesting sea views.

History
The history of Porto Sant'Elpidio is relatively short. From some excavations within the commune's area many important archaeological finds were discovered, which confirmed the presence of Etruscan burial sites that date back to 8th century B.C.. From renaissance maps there are annotations of a small village on the coast, with the name Porto San Lupidio, with a sea teeming with fish and a little away from Castrum Castri, now known as Fermo. In spite of the passage of years and the continued immigration from southern Italy, the village remained small until 1952, when it obtained communal independence from Sant'Elpidio a Mare, changing its name from Porto di Sant'Elpidio a Mare to Porto Sant'Elpidio.

The State Railway stations have promoted a strong increase in the population and the immigration from other parts of the country. An event tied to the railway was the visit to the city from Prince Umberto of Savoy. His name is remembered in a deal with Statale 16 that urbanistically divides the city.

Another important event was the 1950 flood. In those days, torrential rains swelled the beds of the rivers Chienti and Tenna and the absolute lack of a sanitation network worsened the problem. In less than a day a serious quantity of mud and water overran the streets, obstructing the arrival of scarce assistance and destroying many small homes and the harvests. The recovery from this disaster was slow, but life started again some time after.

Coat of arms
Porto Sant'Elpidio's coat of arms is relatively recent. It is a Samnite shield; a top band shows the sea, with a boat sailing very simply (it represents the work of fishermen) and the sun. On the lower band, on the red bottom the worker bee is depicted, to signify the laborious nature of Porto Sant'Elpidio's inhabitants.  On the top of the shield is the crown to the five towers (they represent the commune) that were approved on 19 May 1965 at the site of the crown to nine blackbirds after the independence from Sant'Elpidio a Mare. Below the shield there is a Latin text In Litore Fulget ("Shines on the beach") to indicate the city's coast.

Places of interest
Villa Murri, historical residence; built in the first quarter of the nineteenth century from the Sinibaldi counts, passed down in 1880 to the Maggiori Guerrieri Bonafede counts from Fermo and in 1920 to the Murri family, then in 1953 it was sold to the commune.
Villa Maroni, historical family namesake of property owners in the Corva district.
Villa Baruchello
Villa Fanny, not open to the public, is one of the landowners' homes following the Maroni dynasty in the Corva and Fonteserpe districts.

Demographic evolution
The commune of Porto Sant'Elpidio has never had a uniquely local population. From the original residents not many people remain; in fact, the commune, with the construction of the Concimificio FIM and the presence of still-fertile agricultural lands, has attracted many people from all over Italy, allowing a strong Italian melting pot. Nowadays, the commune hosts many foreign immigrants from, above all, China, India and the African continent.

Associations
The Casa del Volontariato (House of Charity Work) hosts all the main voluntary associations present in the communal territory. The association leader is the P.A. Green Cross section Sandro Garbini.

Culture
Theater of the Bees was inaugurated in the year 2006 with Neri Marcorè as the artistic director. In the summer season, Theaters of the World, an international theatre festival for children, is held.

Economy
At the beginning of the 19th century, the construction of the Concimificio FIM created a considerable increase in the local economy which was previously based on fishing and agriculture. A large contribution to the port's economy came from Costanza Maggiori, descended from the noble family of Corsican origins.  Since the 1960s the footwear industry has been the main economic activity, while the agricultural sector has decreased significantly in importance. In the southern district area (called Faleriense) the practice of small-boat fishing still continues. The city has seen in recent years an increase in the tourism sector based on sunbathing from national and international tourists.

Sport
On 28 May 1992, the 4th stage of the Giro d'Italia ended in Porto Sant'Elpidio with the winner Mario Cipollini.

The soccer team from Porto Sant'Elpidio plays still in Promozione.

The most important local sporting reality is the Porto Sant'Elpidio Basket club which, for more than ten years, has participated in the national championships and Series B2 Series C1 with excellent results. The club is sponsored by the Suolificio Stella srl.

See also
Sant'Elpidio a Mare

References

External links

Official Website (Italian)

Cities and towns in the Marche